Hednota mesochra is a moth in the family Crambidae. It was described by Oswald Bertram Lower in 1896. It is found in Australia.

References

Crambinae
Moths described in 1896